Isisford is a rural town and locality in the Longreach Region, Queensland, Australia.

Geography 
The locality is in Central Western Queensland. The town of Isisford is in the north of the locality.

Small sections of both Idalia National Park and Welford National Park are located within the boundary of the town.

Isisford has the following mountains:

 Double Top 
 Mount Aaron 
 Mount Ellen 
 Mount Grey 
 Mount Malcolm
 Mount Mingera 
 Mount Misery 
 Mount Moses
 Mount Perrier 
 Mount Slowcan
 Mountain Black
 Observatory Hill
 Opal Hill 
 Penny Knob 
 The Sisters
 Yellow Mountain

History

The first European in the area was the explorer Thomas Mitchell, who travelled through the area in 1846. Settlers followed with James Whitman opening a hotel, store and blacksmith by May 1875. The town was surveyed as the Town of Wittown in April 1878; it is said that Whitman named it after himself. However, in May 1878, the name Isisford was proposed and by August 1878 it had been renamed Isisford, because it was near the Isis Downs pastoral run and a ford on the Barcoo River.

Isisford Private School opened in the 1870s. It was by operated by Mr R Venables. It closed when Isisford Provisional School opened on 19 October 1881 with Venables becoming its first teacher. Circa 1883 the provisional school became Isisford State School. In 1892 it became Isisford Provisional School, returning to state school status in January 1894.

A post office and telegraph line were operating by 1881. Isis Downs Post Office opened on 1 June 1868, was replaced by the Wittown office in 1876 which was renamed Isisford in 1878. In the following years the town progressed with the growth of the pastoral industry.

The Queensland Government called for tenders to build a court house in Isisford in August 1883 with the contract awarded to William McLaughlin in November 1883. The court house was completed in November 1885.

In April 1910, Isisford became the first town in Australia to be serviced by a motorised mail delivery (from Ilfracombe,  to the north). A plaque on the post office commemorates the centenary of the commencement of the service.

Isisford Convent School was established in 1950 by the Presentation Sisters. It closed in 1970.

In September 1956, a deliberately lit fire at the Isisford Hotel resulted in the deaths of a mother and her child.

In the mid-1990s, the first fossils of Isisfordia, an extinct genus of crocodile-like animals, was discovered in a dry creek close to the town.  The discovery was made by the town's former Deputy Mayor, Ian Duncan, after which the new species was named.

At the 2011 census, Isisford and the surrounding area had a population of 262. This figure has never surpassed 300.

On 10 September 2021, a new locality called Yaraka was created around the town of Yaraka, the land being excised from the locality of Isisford, to avoid confusion and restore historical connections.

Heritage listings
Isisford has a number of heritage-listed sites, including:
 6 St Agnes Street: Old Isisford District Hospital
 Isisford-Blackall Road: Isis Downs Woolshed

Education
Isisford State School is a government primary (Prep-6) school for boys and girls at 14 St Helena Street. In 2018, the school had an enrolment of 9 students with 2 teachers and 4 non-teaching staff (2 full-time equivalent).

There is no secondary school in Isisford. The nearest government secondary schools are in Longreach and Blackall but are sufficiently distant that distance education and boarding school would be alternatives.

Amenities 
Isisford has a public library at 20 St Mary Street operated by the Longreach Regional Council.

It also has a swimming pool and visitor information centre.

References

External links

 
 
 

 
Towns in Queensland
Longreach Region
Populated places established in 1878
1878 establishments in Australia
Localities in Queensland